The third season of 30 Rock, an American television comedy series, consists of 22 episodes and began airing on October 30, 2008, on the NBC network in the United States. The season was produced by Broadway Video, Little Stranger, and NBC Universal; the executive producers were series creator Tina Fey, Lorne Michaels, Marci Klein, David Miner, and Robert Carlock.

In this season, Liz focuses heavily on her personal life, trying to adopt a child and find a new romantic partner. Meanwhile, Jack Donaghy pursues a new relationship, Jenna Maroney undertakes a new Janis Joplin-based film project, and Tracy Jordan enjoys the success of his video game developed at the end of the previous season.

The third season aired under NBC's promotional banner "Comedy Night Done Right" on Thursdays at 9:30 p.m. Eastern Time. The season was critically acclaimed and received 22 Emmy Award nominations, the most for a single show in 2009. The nominations broke 30 Rock's own record (17) for the most nominated comedy in a single Primetime Emmy Award ceremony. The season was released on DVD as a three-disc boxed set under the title 30 Rock: Season 3 on September 22, 2009, by Universal Studios.

Synopsis
Season 3 continues from the epilogue of the Season 2 finale, Cooter. Jack tries to get his job—and his promotion—back. Meanwhile, Liz tries to adopt a baby, while Tracy enjoys the success of his pornographic video game as Jenna sues him for not properly compensating her.

Season-long plots include Jack meeting a new love interest, Elisa (Salma Hayek), and the search for his real father (portrayed by Alan Alda). Liz also finds a new love interest, Dr. Drew Baird (Jon Hamm), while going through cutbacks and discovering her potential to host a talk show. Jenna is cast as a Janis Joplin-type character since the life rights to Janis Joplin could not be obtained. Kenneth Parcell's (Jack McBrayer) age is also revealed to be questionable. It is also revealed, in the penultimate episode of season 7, that Jack and Jenna were romantically involved throughout season 3.

Crew
The third season was produced by Broadway Video, Little Stranger, Inc., and Universal Media Studios and aired on NBC. The executive producers were series creator Tina Fey, Lorne Michaels, Marci Klein, David Miner, and Robert Carlock. Jack Burditt, John Riggi, and Ron Weiner acted as co-executive producers. The producers for the season were Alec Baldwin, Jerry Kupfer, and Don Scardino with Diana Schmidt and Irene Burns as co-producers. Joann Alfano had been the executive producer for the first and second seasons and vacated that position afterward.  Ron Weiner became a co-executive producer after being a story editor for the second season. Alec Baldwin, who plays Jack Donaghy in the series, became a producer for the third season.

There were 11 directors through the season. Those who directed multiple episodes were series producer Don Scardino, Gail Mancuso, and Beth McCarthy. There were eight directors who each directed one episode throughout the season: Steve Buscemi, Todd Holland, Constantine Makris, John Riggi, Ken Whittingham, Tricia Brock, Millicent Shelton, and Scott Ellis. Series writers who penned episodes this season include Tina Fey, Robert Carlock, Jack Burditt, John Riggi, and Matt Hubbard.

Cast

Ten actors received star billing. Tina Fey portrayed Liz Lemon, the head writer of a fictitious live-sketch-comedy television series TGS. The TGS cast consists of three actors. The lead actor is the loose cannon movie star Tracy Jordan, portrayed by Tracy Morgan. The co-stars are the dense Jenna Maroney, portrayed by Jane Krakowski and Josh Girard, who is also a writer for TGS, portrayed by Lonny Ross. Jack McBrayer played the naïve NBC page Kenneth Parcell. Scott Adsit acted as the witty and wise TGS producer, Pete Hornberger. Judah Friedlander portrayed trucker hat-wearing staff writer Frank Rossitano. Alec Baldwin played the NBC network executive Jack Donaghy. Donaghy's full corporate title for the majority of the season is "Head of East Coast Television and Microwave Oven Programming". Keith Powell played the Harvard University alumnus and TGS staff writer James "Toofer" Spurlock. Katrina Bowden acted as writers' assistant Cerie Xerox. Other cast members include, Maulik Pancholy as Jonathan, Grizz Chapman as Grizz Griswold, and Kevin Brown as "Dot Com" Slattery. The cast featured recurring characters, including John Lutz as J.D. Lutz, and Chris Parnell as Dr. Leo Spaceman.

Salma Hayek had a recurring guest appearance in six episodes as Elisa, a nurse for Jack Donaghy's mother and Donaghy's eventual love interest. She first appeared in "Señor Macho Solo" and made her final appearance in "The Ones". Steve Buscemi appeared in the episodes "The Natural Order" and "Mamma Mia" as Lenny Wosniak, a private detective occasionally hired by Donaghy. Alan Alda appeared in the episodes "Mamma Mia" and "Kidney Now!" as Milton Greene, a man believed to be Jack Donaghy's father.

Main cast
 Tina Fey as Liz Lemon, the head writer of TGS, a live sketch comedy television show. (22 episodes)
 Tracy Morgan as Tracy Jordan, a loose cannon movie star and cast member of TGS. (22 episodes)
 Jane Krakowski as Jenna Maroney, a vain, fame-obsessed TGS cast member and Liz's best friend. (20 episodes, does not appear in “Gavin Volure”, “Larry King”)
 Jack McBrayer as Kenneth Parcell, a naïve, television-loving NBC page from Georgia. (22 episodes)
 Scott Adsit as Pete Hornberger, the witty and wise producer of TGS. (14 episodes)
 Judah Friedlander as Frank Rossitano, an immature staff writer for TGS. (18 episodes) 
 Alec Baldwin as Jack Donaghy, a high-flying NBC network executive and Liz's mentor. (22 episodes)
 Katrina Bowden as Cerie Xerox, the young, attractive TGS general assistant. (16 episodes)
 Keith Powell as James "Toofer" Spurlock, a proud African-American staff writer for TGS. (11 episodes) 
 Lonny Ross as Josh Girard, a young, unintelligent TGS cast member. (4 episodes)
 Kevin Brown as Walter "Dot Com" Slattery, a member of Tracy's entourage. (14 episodes)
 Grizz Chapman as Warren "Grizz" Griswold, a member of Tracy's entourage. (14 episodes)
 Maulik Pancholy as Jonathan, Jack's assistant who is obsessed with him. (9 episodes)

Recurring cast
 John Lutz as J.D. Lutz, a lazy, overweight TGS writer who is often ridiculed by his co-workers. (13 episodes)
 Salma Hayek as Elisa Pedrera, a Puerto Rican nurse and Jack's love interest. (6 episodes) 
 Chris Parnell as Dr. Leo Spaceman, a physician who practices questionable medical techniques. (4 episodes)
Todd Buonopane as Jeffrey Weinerslav, an employee in GE's human resources department. (3 episodes)
 Jon Hamm as Dr. Andrew "Drew" Baird, a pediatrician and Liz's neighbor who she takes a romantic interest in. (3 episodes)
 Elaine Stritch as Colleen Donaghy, Jack's cold and overbearing mother. (3 episodes)
 Alan Alda as Milton Greene, Jack's biological father. (2 episodes)
 Steve Buscemi as Lenny Wosniak, a private investigator hired by Jack. (2 episodes)
 Marceline Hugot as Kathy Geiss, Don Geiss' socially awkward middle-aged daughter. (2 episodes)
 Nancy O'Dell as herself (2 episodes)
 Sherri Shepherd as Angie Jordan, Tracy's no-nonsense wife. (2 episodes)
 Rip Torn as Don Geiss, CEO of GE and Jack's boss and mentor. (2 episodes)
 Meredith Viera as herself (2 episodes)

Guest stars
 Clay Aiken as himself (Episode: "Kidney Now!")
 Harry Anderson as himself (Episode: "The One with the Cast of Night Court")
 Jennifer Aniston as Claire Harper, Liz and Jenna's old roommate from college. (Episode: "The One with the Cast of Night Court")
 Will Arnett as Devon Banks, NBC's Vice President of West Coast News, Web Content and Theme Park Talent Relations and Jack's nemesis. (Episode: "Do-Over")
 Sara Bareilles as herself (Episode: "Kidney Now!")
 Roger Bart as Brad Halster, a consultant hired to slash TGS's budget. (Episode: "Cutbacks")
 Beastie Boys as themselves (Episode: "Kidney Now!")
 Mary J. Blige as herself (Episode: "Kidney Now!")
 Billy Bush as himself (Episode: "Señor Macho Solo")
 Elvis Costello as himself (Episode: "Kidney Now!")
 Sheryl Crow as herself (Episode: "Kidney Now!")
 Peter Dinklage as Stewart LaGrange, a diplomatic attaché at the United Nations who Liz dates. (Episode: "Señor Macho Solo")
 Steve Earle as himself (Episode: "Kidney Now!")
 Donald Glover as a gay kid. (Episode: "Kidney Now!")
 Jackie Hoffman as Rochelle Gaulke, the defendant in a case in which Liz is on the jury. (Episode: "The Funcooker")
 Wyclef Jean as himself (Episode: "Kidney Now!")
 Norah Jones as herself (Episode: "Kidney Now!")
 Calvin Klein as himself (Episode: "The Bubble")
 Larry King as himself (Episode: "Larry King")
 Talib Kweli as himself (Episode: "Kidney Now!")
 Matt Lauer as himself (Episode: "Generalissimo")
 Cyndi Lauper as herself (Episode: "Kidney Now!")
 Adam Levine as himself (Episode: "Kidney Now!")
 John Lithgow as himself (Episode: "Goodbye, My Friend") 
 Patti LuPone as Sylvia Rossitano, Frank's stereotypical Italian-American mother. (Episode: "Goodbye, My Friend")
 Steve Martin as Gavin Volure, an agoraphobic entrepreneur who takes an interest in Liz. (Episode: "Gavin Volure")
 Michael McDonald as himself (Episode: "Kidney Now!")
 John McEnroe as himself (Episode: "Gavin Volure")
 Rhett Miller as himself (Episode: "Kidney Now!")
 Moby as himself (Episode: "Kidney Now!")
 Janel Moloney as Jessica, a member of Liz's graduating class from high school. (Episode: "Reunion")
 Megan Mullally as Bev, Liz's hostile adoption agent. (Episode: "Do-Over")
 Diane Neal as Erin, a member of Liz's graduating class from high school. (Episode: "Reunion")
 Don Pardo as Sid, the TGS announcer. (Episode: "Cutbacks")
 Paula Pell as Paula Hornberger, Pete's wife. (Episode: "Kidney Now!")
 Markie Post as herself (Episode: "The One with the Cast of Night Court")
 Robert Randolph as himself (Episode: "Kidney Now!")
 Charlie Robinson as himself (Episode: "The One with the Cast of Night Court")
 Amy Schumer as a stylist. (Episode: "Mamma Mia")
 Maria Thayer as Jennifer Rogers, a blind woman who Kenneth has a crush on. (Episode: "St. Valentine's Day")
 Adam West as himself (Episode: "Apollo, Apollo")
 Brian Williams as himself (Episode: "The Ones")
 Oprah Winfrey as herself (Episode: "Believe in the Stars")
 Dean Winters as Dennis Duffy, Liz's immature ex-boyfriend. (Episode: "Apollo, Apollo")
 Rachael Yamagata as herself (Episode: "Kidney Now!")

Episodes

Reception

Critical reception
On Rotten Tomatoes, the season has an approval rating of 92% with an average score of 8.3 out of 10 based on 38 reviews. The website's critical consensus reads, "Brandishing its trademark silliness with vigor, 30 Rocks third season hits the ground running and cements its reputation as one of the smartest, funniest comedies on television." Robert Canning of IGN called the third season "a series at the top of its game", scoring the season a 9.3 out of 10. In particular, Canning noted that the "first half of the year ... had the most focus." Canning said the premiere episode "Do-Over" was "filled to capacity with comedy", called "Señor Macho Solo" "near perfect", but said the story for the finale "Kidney Now!" was "fun" but "average for a season finale." Alynda Wheat of Entertainment Weekly, reviewing the DVD release, gave the season an A−. Jeremy Medina of Paste magazine also reviewed the premiere, saying it was "sort of like the first day of school after summer vacation: sort of awkward at times, but fast and buoyant and warmly familiar all the same". Brian Lowry of Variety was more critical, calling the third season "wildly uneven" and saying 30 Rock was "merely a good comedy whose shortcomings prevent it from joining the ranks of great ones." The season is also noted by critics positively due to the praise of Tracy Morgan and Jack McBrayer's performance. Metacritic, which gives a score based on critical reviews, gave the season a rating of 84% from 17 reviews, signifying "universal acclaim".

Ratings
The season premiere, "Do-Over", received 8.7 million viewers and was the highest-rated episode of the series. The sixth episode "Christmas Special" would break that mark, garnering 8.9 million viewers. Digital Video Recorder (DVR) accounted for an average additional 1.2 million viewers for episodes of the third season. 30 Rock is the most popular series among upscale viewers, defined as those who have an income higher than $100,000 a year, on the broadcast networks. The show averaged 7.7 million viewers through the first ten episodes, a ratings level that Variety called "solid" and credited to pairing the show with The Office on NBC's Thursday schedule. The season finale, "Kidney Now!", aired on May 14, 2009, and was viewed by 5.7 million viewers.

Awards and nominations
This season of 30 Rock received 22 Emmy Award nominations, the most for a show in 2009, breaking  30 Rock own record for the most nominated comedy in a single Primetime Emmy Award year (previously 17). At the 61st Primetime Emmy Awards, 30 Rock won two Creative Arts Emmy Awards, "Outstanding Casting for a Comedy Series" and "Outstanding Picture Editing for a Comedy Series", for the episode "Apollo, Apollo". The show won three Primetime Emmy Awards: "Outstanding Comedy Series", Alec Baldwin won "Outstanding Lead Actor in a Comedy Series" for his role as Jack Donaghy, and Matt Hubbard won "Outstanding Writing in a Comedy Series" for his work on "Reunion". Tina Fey, though nominated, did not win "Outstanding Lead Actress in a Comedy Series", which she had  won the previous year; Toni Collette from The United States of Tara won instead. CNN called the decision a "mild surprise", saying Fey was the "heavy favorite".

Distribution
30 Rock is broadcast in Canada, the United Kingdom (UK), and Australia, in addition to the United States. The show was simulcast in Canada on Citytv. This season of 30 Rock was shown in Australia on the Seven Network at 11:30 p.m. local time starting on February 2, 2009. The third season began in the UK on October 5, 2009, on Comedy Central, moving from Five where the previous season had aired.

The season was released on DVD by Universal Studios on September 22, 2009, in the United States and Canada after it had completed an initial broadcast run on NBC. The DVD set is scheduled for Australian release on November 11, 2009. The 3-disc set of 22 episodes has a 1.78:1 aspect ratio, Dolby Surround 2.0 and 5.1, and English and Spanish subtitles. In addition to the episodes, the DVD set special features included unaired scenes, featurettes, and audio commentary on the select episodes, "Flu Shot", "Goodbye, My Friend", "The Bubble", "Apollo, Apollo", "The Ones", "Mamma Mia" and "Kidney Now!".

References

External links 

 
 

 
2008 American television seasons
2009 American television seasons